The 2016–17 season is the Al-Hilal Saudi Football Club's 60th in existence and 41st consecutive season in the top flight of Saudi Arabian football. Along with Pro League, the club also competes in the AFC Champions League, Super Cup, Crown Prince Cup and the King Cup.

Players

Squad information
Players and squad numbers last updated on 31 January 2017.Note: Flags indicate national team as has been defined under FIFA eligibility rules. Players may hold more than one non-FIFA nationality.

Transfers

In

Out

Loan in

Loan out

Pre-season and friendlies

Competitions

Overall

Last Updated: 25 October 2016

Saudi Super Cup

Pro League

League table

Results summary

Results by round

Matches
All times are local, AST (UTC+3).

Crown Prince Cup

Al-Hilal started the tournament directly to the round of 16, as one of last year's finalists. All times are local, AST (UTC+3).

King Cup

AFC Champions League

Group stage

Knockout stage

Statistics

Goalscorers

Last Updated: 10 June 2017

Clean sheets

Last Updated: 10 April 2017

References

Al Hilal SFC seasons
Hilal